The men's qualification for the Olympic basketball tournament took place from 2019 to 2021; all five FIBA (International Basketball Federation) zones were expected to have representation in the Olympic basketball event. (The Olympics was postponed to 2021 due to the COVID-19 pandemic).

Japan as host qualified directly. The first qualifying tournament was the 2019 FIBA Basketball World Cup in which seven teams qualified for the Olympics. The next best 16 teams in the FIBA Basketball World that did not qualify directly to the Olympics along with two select teams from each of the four FIBA regions or 24 teams participated in four separate wild card tournaments which determined the final four teams which played in the Olympics.

Method
A total of 12 teams took part in the Olympics, with each NOC sending in one team.

Qualification via hosting the Olympics
Japan qualified to participate in the Olympic men's basketball event as the host nation.

Qualification via World Cup
The best finishing team/s in the 2019 FIBA Basketball World Cup from each FIBA zone qualifies directly to the Olympics.

FIBA Africa: 1 team
FIBA Americas: 2 teams
FIBA Asia: 1 team
FIBA Europe: 2 teams
FIBA Oceania: 1 team

Qualification via the wild card tournament
The additional four qualifying teams were determined through four FIBA World Olympic Qualifying Tournaments of six teams each, i.e., 24 teams in total. The tournaments were contested by the 16 best non-qualifying teams at the 2019 World Cup and an additional eight teams—two teams from each of the four regions of Africa, Americas, Asia (and Oceania), and Europe. According to the 2019 FIBA Basketball World Cup results, each zone is allocated with the following berths:

FIBA Africa: 3 teams
FIBA Americas: 7 teams
FIBA Asia and FIBA Oceania: 3 teams
FIBA Europe : 11 teams

Qualified teams

2019 FIBA Basketball World Cup

Final standing by FIBA zone

FIBA World Olympic Qualifying Tournaments

After the 2019 FIBA Basketball World Cup results, each zone was represented by the following national teams:

Victoria, Split, Kaunas and Belgrade had been awarded the hosting rights of the four tournaments. They were originally scheduled to take place from 23 to 28 June 2020 but were postponed due to the COVID-19 pandemic, to 22 June to 4 July 2021, with the exact dates to be announced.

The FIBA Olympic Qualifying Tournaments included the 16 best-placed non-qualified teams from the 2019 FIBA Basketball World Cup and two highest-ranked countries per region in the FIBA World Ranking. On 19 September 2019, FIBA announced those teams, which are Angola and Senegal (Africa), Mexico and Uruguay (Americas), China and Korea (Asia-Oceania), and Croatia and Slovenia (Europe).

New Zealand withdrew from the OQT in February 2021, which led to FIBA replacing them with the Philippines, the next best team from the Asia-Pacific region.

Draw
In 2020 four qualifying tournaments, each producing a team which was qualified for the 2020 Summer Olympics. The format consisted of 24 national teams divided into four tournaments of six teams each, with the winning team from each event qualifying for the Olympics. The draw took place on 27 November 2019.

References

 
Basketball at the 2020 Summer Olympics
Qualification for the 2020 Summer Olympics
2020